Sennett may refer to:

Blake Sennett (born 1973), American musician
George Burritt Sennett (1840–1900), American ornithologist and businessman
Mack Sennett (1880-1960), movie director 
Maud Arncliffe Sennett (1862-1935) British suffragette
Richard Sennett (born 1943), American sociologist 
Sennett, New York, a town in New York, United States

See also
 Sennet (disambiguation)
 Senet, a board game from ancient Egypt
 Senate, a deliberative assembly